Perth Glory Football Club is an Australian professional soccer club based in Perth, Western Australia. The club was formed in 1995 and played its first competitive match in the first round of the 1996–97 National Soccer League in October 1996. They have played at their current home ground, Perth Oval, since their establishment. Perth is one of the three A-League clubs to survive the demise of the National Soccer League, the previous top division in Australian soccer. The club has participated in every A-League season since being implemented into the inaugural A-League season in 2005.

Perth has won a total of six major trophies, including the League Premiership four times and the League Championship twice. The club has also participated in six Grand Finals (Four in the National Soccer League and two in the A-League), two Australia Cup finals, two A-League Pre-Season Challenge Cup finals, and one AFC Champions League competition.

The list encompasses information about every season played by the club, including the division the club played in, the club's finishing position, placement in finals if applicable, top goalscorers, and performance in other competitions, such as the Australia Cup and the AFC Champions League, and the club's achievements in major competitions.

Key
Key to league competitions:

 National Soccer League (NSL) – Australia's former top men's football league, established in 1977
 A-League Men (A-League) – Australia's top men's football league, established in 2004

Key to colours and symbols:

Key to league record:
 Season = The year and article of the season
 Pos = Final position
 Pld = Games played
 W = Games won
 D = Games drawn
 L = Games lost
 GF = Goals scored
 GA = Goals against
 Pts = Points

Key to cup record:
 DNE = The club did not enter cup play
 DQ = Disqualified
 QR1 = First qualification round
 QR2 = Second qualification round, etc.
 PR = Play-off round
 Group = Group stage
 GS2 = Second group stage
 R1 = First round, etc.
 R32 = Round of 32
 R16 = Round of 16
 EF = Elimination finals
 QF = Quarter-finals
 SF = Semi-finals
 PF = Preliminary finals
 RU = Runners-up
 W = Winners

Seasons

Notes

References

General
 
 
 

Perth Glory FC seasons
Perth Glory FC
P